Acyclic graph may refer to:
Directed acyclic graph, a directed graph without any directed cycles
Forest (graph theory), an undirected acyclic graph
Polytree, a directed graph without any undirected cycles